The 38th Blue Dragon Film Awards ceremony was held on November 25, 2017 at Kyung Hee University's Peace Palace Hall in Seoul. It was live broadcast on SBS and hosted by Kim Hye-soo and Lee Sun-kyun. Organized by Sports Chosun (a sister brand of Chosun Ilbo), the annual award show honored the best in Korean language films released from October 7, 2016 to October 3, 2017.

Nominations and winners 

Complete list of nominees and winners

Winners are listed first, highlighted in boldface, and indicated with a double dagger.

Main awards

Other awards
 Best Short Film: 
A Hand-written Poster (Director Kwak Eun-mi)

 Audience Choice Award for Most Popular Film:
1st – A Taxi Driver
2nd – Confidential Assignment
3rd – Master
4th – Luck Key
5th – The Outlaws

 Popular Star Award:
Jo In-sung - The King
Kim Su-an - The Battleship Island
Na Moon-hee - I Can Speak
Sol Kyung-gu - The Merciless

Films with multiple wins 
The following films received multiple wins:

Films with multiple nominations 
The following films received multiple nominations:

Presenters
Actor Cha Tae-hyun appeared and gave a memorial speech for Late Kim Ji-young (1938–2017), Late  (1944–2017), Late Kim Young-ae (1951–2017) and Late Kim Joo-hyuk (1972–2017).

Special performances

References 

2017 film awards
Blue Dragon Film Awards
2017 in South Korean cinema